KV Sampath Kumar (1957 – 30 June 2021)  was an editor for Sanskrit newspaper "Sudharma" from Mysuru, Karnataka, India. In 2020, he along with his wife was selected for the Padma Shri honour from the Government of India for his contribution to the field of Literature & Education.

Career 
Sampath Kumar started his career in Sanskrit journalism by joining his father's Sanskrit newspaper Sudharma and was a law graduate and was Vidwath in Sahithya.

Kumar died at the age of 64 on 30 June 2021 following a heart attack.

Awards
 2020: Received the Padma Shri from the Government of India for the contribution to the field of Literature & Education.

References 

1950s births
2021 deaths
Year of birth uncertain

Indian newspaper editors

Recipients of the Padma Shri in literature & education
People from Mysore